is a Japanese manga artist known for her seinen comedy manga Thermae Romae. She was born in Tokyo, but now lives in Chicago. She was awarded the 3rd Manga Taishō and the Short Story Award in the 2010 Tezuka Osamu Cultural Prizes. An anime adaptation of the manga has been produced and aired and a live-action film adaptation is in the works.

The live-action film Thermae Romae was released in April 2012 and its sequel Thermae Romae II came out in 2014.

Selected works
 (2001)
 (2003)
 (2005)
 (2006)
 (2007)
 (2008)
 (2007)
 (2008)
 (2009)
 (2009, 、)
 (2010)
PIL (2010)
 (2010)
 (2010)
Sweet Home Chicago (2011)
 (2011)
 (2012)
Jobs (2013)
 (2013) (in collaboration with Tori Miki)
 (2018)

Honours
  Commander of the Order of the Star of Italy, for her contribution to the growth of Italian culture (2017)

References

External links 

Manga artists from Tokyo
Japanese female comics artists
Women manga artists
Living people
1967 births
People from Tokyo
Manga Taishō
Female comics writers
Japanese women writers